The 1972 Cleveland Indians season was the 72nd in franchise history. The team finished fifth in the American League East with a record of 72–84, 14 games behind the Detroit Tigers.

Offseason

George Steinbrenner offer
On December 6, 1971, George Steinbrenner led a group of investors (including Ted Bonda, Ed Jeffrey, Howard Metzenbaum, Steve O'Neill, Gabe Paul and Al Rosen) that negotiated with Jim Stouffer, the son of Indians owner Vernon Stouffer about the potential purchase of the franchise. The group offered $8.6 million and agreed to absorb $300,000 in debt (Stouffer borrowed against the Indians television contract for 1972). Although Steinbrenner and Jim Stouffer agreed to a sale, Vernon Stouffer disapproved of the deal. He felt that he was able of getting $10 million for the franchise.

Notable transactions 
 November 29, 1971: Sam McDowell was traded by the Indians to the San Francisco Giants for Gaylord Perry and Frank Duffy.
 December 2, 1971: Roy Foster, Ken Suarez, Mike Paul, and Rich Hand were traded by the Indians to the Texas Rangers for Del Unser, Gary Jones, Terry Ley, and Denny Riddleberger.
 December 6, 1971: Adolfo Phillips was purchased by the Indians from the Montreal Expos.

Regular season

Season standings

Record vs. opponents

Notable transactions 
 June 6, 1972: 1972 Major League Baseball Draft
Rick Manning was drafted by the Indians in the 1st round (2nd pick).
Dennis Eckersley was drafted by the Indians in the 3rd round. Player signed June 12, 1972.
Rick Langford was drafted by the Indians in the 36th round, but did not sign.
 September 18, 1972: Lowell Palmer was selected off waivers by the Indians from the St. Louis Cardinals.

Opening Day Lineup

Roster

Player stats

Batting
Note: G = Games played; AB = At bats; R = Runs scored; H = Hits; 2B = Doubles; 3B = Triples; HR = Home runs; RBI = Runs batted in; AVG = Batting average; SB = Stolen bases

Pitching
Note: W = Wins; L = Losses; ERA = Earned run average; G = Games pitched; GS = Games started; SV = Saves; IP = Innings pitched; R = Runs allowed; ER = Earned runs allowed; BB = Walks allowed; K = Strikeouts

Awards and honors 

All-Star Game
 Gaylord Perry, pitcher, reserve

Farm system

Notes

References 
1972 Cleveland Indians team page at Baseball Reference
1972 Cleveland Indians team page at www.baseball-almanac.com

Cleveland Guardians seasons
Cleveland Indians season
Cincinnati Indians